The 2nd Czech Republic Hockey League (or Czech 2.liga) is the third-level ice hockey league in the Czech Republic under the 1st Czech Republic Hockey League. It began in 1993.

Format 
From 1993 to 2001 the league was divided into the Western and Eastern divisions. 

From the 1996/1997 season the play-offs were introduced, they were joint for both divisions

From 1999 to 2001 the Western and Eastern division had separate play-offs.

Since the 2001/2002 season the current division to Western, Central and Eastern applies, with the exception of the 2008/2009 season when the Central Division was incorporated into the Western Division. . 

From the 2001/2002 season the Western and Central divisions have joint play-offs, while the Eastern Division has separate play-offs.

For the 2009/2010 season, 33 teams are divided into the Western, Central and Eastern divisions. Winners of the league play-offs play a qualification round robin with the worst teams from the 1st Czech Republic Hockey League. 

The league has shrunk down to just 2 divisions and 28 teams, with 17 playing in the Western division and 11 in the Eastern, for the 2013/14 season. 

Since the 2014/15 season, the winners of the Western and Eastern division play-offs face each other in a best-of-7 series. The winner directly advances to the First League, without having to play the qualification series. The last placed team in each division at the end of regular season will be directly relegated to the regional championship. 

Since the 2016/17 season, the league has gone back to having 3 divisions and 27 teams.

Since the season 2022/23, the league returned 2 divisions Western and Eastern, The winners of the Western and Eastern division play-offs face each other in a best-of-7 series, The winner directly advances to 1st Czech Republic Hockey League

2022-23 teams

Champions
 1994 IHC Písek, HC ZVVZ Milevsko
 1995 HC Karlovy Vary, SK Horácká Slavia Třebíč
 1996 HC Příbram, HC Milevsko, SK Horácká Slavia Třebíč
 1997 HC Znojmo, SK Horácká Slavia Třebíč
 1998 SK Kadaň, HC Šumperk
 1999 HC Slovan Ústí nad Labem, HC Šumperk
 2000 HC Slovan Ústí nad Labem, HC Ytong Brno
 2001 BK Mladá Boleslav, HC Baník Most, HC Nový Jičín
 2002 BK Mladá Boleslav, HC Baník Most, HC Orlová
 2003 HC Benátky nad Jizerou, HC Baník Most, HC Olomouc
 2004 HC Baník Most, HC Vajgar Jindřichův Hradec, HC Sareza Ostrava
 2005 HC Vajgar Jindřichův Hradec, HC Rebel Havlíčkův Brod, HC Prostějov
 2006 HC Rebel Havlíčkův Brod, IHC Písek, VSK Technika Brno
 2007 HC Vrchlabí, HC Most, HC Šumperk
 2008 VSK Technika Brno, HC Chrudim, HC Benátky nad Jizerou
 2009 Hokej Šumperk 2003, HC Tábor, HC ZVVZ Milevsko
 2010 HC Bobři Valašské Meziříčí, HC Stadion Litoměřice, IHC Písek
 2011 KLH Vajgar Jindřichův Hradec, HC Baník Most, Salith Šumperk
 2012 HC Klášterec nad Ohří, SHK Hodonín, HC AZ Havířov 2010
 2013 HC Tábor, VSK Technika Brno, HC AZ Havířov 2010
 2014 LHK Jestřábi Prostějov, HC Baník Sokolov, SC Kolín
 2015 HC ZUBR Přerov, HC Tábor, HC Baník Sokolov
 2016 HC Tábor, HC Vlci Jablonec nad Nisou, HC Frýdek-Místek
 2017 VHK Vsetín, HC Vlci Jablonec nad Nisou, BK Havlíčkův Brod
 2018 HC RT TORAX Poruba, HC Vlci Jablonec nad Nisou, BK Havlíčkův Brod
 2019 HC Baník Sokolov
 2020 Draci Pars Šumperk, SC Kolín, HC Stadion Vrchlabí (automatically promoted)
 2021 cancelled
 2022 HC Tábor
 2023

External links 
 http://www.hokej.cz
 http://hokej.idnes.cz

Czech
Sports leagues established in 1993
1993 establishments in the Czech Republic
Professional ice hockey leagues in the Czech Republic